Csempeszkopács is a village in Vas County, Hungary.

History
The village was created by uniting two villages, Csempeszháza and Kopács, in the 19th century. In 1910 the village had 313 inhabitants.

The Árpád Age Church
 The most important architectural heritage of the village is the Árpád Age church. It was the church of the Kopács part of the village. It was dedicated to Saint Michael archangel. This 13th-century romanesque style church stands on a little hill. Inside details of the medieval murals can be seen. Later the church was renewed in the barock style. The main altar's painting was painted by Stephan Dorfmeister.
 In the Csempesz part of the village, there is a castle of late renaissance of Balog-family. elynek It has been built in the late 16th century, later renewed in barock style. It also contains the local history museum.

References
 Aradi N. (Ed.): A művészet története Magyarországon, (The History of Art in Hungary), Gondolat, Budapest 
 Fülep L. (Ed.): A magyarországi művészet története. (The History of Hungarian Art), Budapest
 Marosi E. (1972): A román kor művészete, (Art of the Roman Age). Corvina, Budapest,  
 Gerevich T. (1938): Magyarország románkori emlékei. (Die romanische Denkmäler Ungarns.) Egyetemi nyomda. Budapest, 
 Gerő, L. (1984): Magyar műemléki ABC. (Hungarian Architectural Heritage ABC.) Budapest 
 Henszlmann, I. (1876): Magyarország ó-keresztyén, román és átmeneti stylü mű-emlékeinek rövid ismertetése, (Old-Christian, Romanesque and Transitional Style Architecture in Hungary). Királyi Magyar Egyetemi Nyomda, Budapest
 Valter I. (2005): Árpád-kori téglatemplomok Nyugat-Dunántúlon. (Árpád Age Brick-Churches in Transdanubia, Hungary). Budapest
 Dercsényi D. (1959): Árpád-kori mûemlékeink Vas megyében. (Árpád Age Architectural Heritage in Vas County). Vasi Szemle 1959. 2. sz. 
 Ernst M. (1935): A dunántúli falfestés középkori emlékei. (Medieval Murals in Transdanubia, Hungary). Pestvidéki nyomda. Budapest, 84 p., 15 table.
 Genthon I. (1959): Magyarország mûemlékei. I. Dunántúl. (Architectural Heritage of Hungary. I. Transdanubia). Budapest, 1959. 444 p.

External links

 The homepage of the village
 About the Csempeszkopács church
 The map of the village
 Photogalery
 Images of the church
 Street map 

Populated places in Vas County
Romanesque architecture in Hungary